Atera may refer to:

 Atera (restaurant)
 Atera Seven Falls - waterfall in Japan